Ruthenian Americans may refer to:

 Rusyn Americans, also referred to as Carpatho-Ruthenian Americans
 Ukrainian Americans, historically also designated as Ruthenian Americans
 White-Ruthenian Americans, an old term for Belarusian Americans

See also
 Ruthenia (disambiguation)
 Ruthenian (disambiguation)
 Carpatho-Ruthenian (disambiguation)
 Carpatho-Ruthenians (disambiguation)